AutoCollage 2008 is a Microsoft photomontage desktop application. The software creates a collage of representative elements from a set of images. It is able to detect faces and recognize objects.

The software was developed by Microsoft Research labs in Cambridge, England and launched on September 4, 2008.

Versions
An update, named Microsoft Research AutoCollage 2008 version 1.1, was released on February, 2009. The software update adds the ability to select images for the AutoCollage, a richer integration with Windows Live Photo Gallery, support for network folders and the ability to define custom output sizes.

A new version, named Microsoft Research AutoCollage Touch 2009, was released in September 2009, and included by some OEMs on machines with Windows 7.

References

External links
 Description of Microsoft Research AutoCollage 2008 version 1.1
 Passport Photo Workshop
 AutoCollage blog

2008 software
Microsoft software
Photo software
Image processing software
Computer vision software